Events from the year 1875 in France.

Incumbents
President: Patrice de MacMahon, Duke of Magenta 
President of the Council of Ministers: Ernest Courtot de Cissey (until 10 March), Louis Buffet (starting 10 March)

Events
20 May – Convention du Mètre signed in Paris.
Cize–Bolozon viaduct opens to rail traffic across the Ain.
Gallium is discovered by Paul Emile Lecoq de Boisbaudran.

Arts and literature
5 January – The Palais Garnier, one of the most famous opera houses in the world, is inaugurated as the home of the Paris Opera.
3 March – The first performance of Bizet's Carmen at the Opéra Comique, Paris, 3 months before the composer's death.
The Flammarion publishing firm is founded in Paris.

Births
17 February – Fanny Clar, journalist and writer (died 1944)
21 February – Jeanne Calment, supercentenarian and the oldest living person ever documented in history (died 1997)
7 March – Maurice Ravel, composer and pianist (died 1937)
27 March – Cécile Vogt-Mugnier, neurologist (died 1962)
4 April – Pierre Monteux, conductor (died 1964)
5 April – Mistinguett, singer (born 1956)
27 April – Maurice, 6th duc de Broglie, physicist (died 1960)
28 June – Henri Lebesgue, mathematician (died 1941)
31 July – Jacques Villon, painter and printmaker (died 1963)
6 August – Marcel Labey, conductor and composer (died 1968)
27 September – Cléo de Mérode, dancer (died 1966)

Full date unknown
Maurice Princet, mathematician and actuary (died 1973)

Deaths

January to June
1 January – Jacques Crétineau-Joly, journalist and historian (born 1803)
3 January – Pierre Larousse, grammarian and lexicographer (born 1817)
10 January – Anton Melbye, Danish painter (born 1818)
20 January – Jean-François Millet, painter (born 1814)
22 February – Jean-Baptiste-Camille Corot, painter (born 1796)
1 March – Tristan Corbière, poet (born 1845)
25 March – Louis Amédée Achard, novelist (born 1814)
4 May – Michel Lévy, publisher (born 1821)
5 May – Alexandre Boreau, pharmacist and botanist (born 1803)
10 May – Gustave Thuret, botanist (born 1817)
31 May – Eliphas Levi, occult author and magician (born 1810)
3 June – Georges Bizet, composer and pianist (born 1838)
24 June – Henri Labrouste, architect (born 1801)
25 June – Antoine-Louis Barye, sculptor (born 1796)

July to December
11 August – Charles Rohault de Fleury, architect (born 1801)
25 August – Charles Auguste Frossard, general (born 1807)
12 October – Jean-Baptiste Carpeaux, sculptor and painter (born 1827)
24 October – Jacques Paul Migne, priest, theologian and publisher (born 1800)
17 November – Jacques-Marie-Achille Ginoulhiac, Bishop (born 1806)

Full date unknown
Charles Auguste Désiré Filon, historian (born 1800)

References

1870s in France